Onix Cortés Aldama (born 12 December 1988) is a Cuban judoka.  She competed for Cuba at the 2012 Summer Olympics, but was knocked out in her first match by Haruka Tachimoto.

Notes

References

External links
 
 

1988 births
Living people
Judoka at the 2011 Pan American Games
Judoka at the 2015 Pan American Games
Judoka at the 2019 Pan American Games
Judoka at the 2012 Summer Olympics
Olympic judoka of Cuba
Cuban female judoka
Pan American Games gold medalists for Cuba
Pan American Games silver medalists for Cuba
Pan American Games medalists in judo
Universiade medalists in judo
People from Havana
Universiade bronze medalists for Cuba
Medalists at the 2013 Summer Universiade
Medalists at the 2011 Pan American Games
Medalists at the 2015 Pan American Games
Medalists at the 2019 Pan American Games
21st-century Cuban women